The Esiliiga was the second level of ice hockey in Estonia from 2006–2009. HC Sokol Tallinn won the league in 2006–07.

References

External links
League on eurohockey.com

Ice hockey leagues in Estonia
Est